In topology, a branch of mathematics, intersection homology is an analogue of singular homology especially well-suited for the study of singular spaces, discovered by Mark Goresky and Robert MacPherson in the fall of 1974 and developed by them over the next few years.

Intersection cohomology was used to prove the Kazhdan–Lusztig conjectures and the Riemann–Hilbert correspondence. It is closely related to L2 cohomology.

Goresky–MacPherson approach
The homology groups of a compact, oriented, connected, n-dimensional manifold X have a fundamental property called Poincaré duality: there is a perfect pairing

Classically—going back, for instance, to Henri Poincaré—this duality was understood in terms of intersection theory. An element of

is represented by a j-dimensional cycle. If an i-dimensional and an -dimensional cycle are in general position, then their intersection is a finite collection of points. Using the orientation of X one may assign to each of these points a sign; in other words intersection yields a 0-dimensional cycle. One may prove that the homology class of this cycle depends only on the homology classes of the original i- and -dimensional cycles; one may furthermore prove that this pairing is perfect.

When X has singularities—that is, when the space has places that do not look like —these ideas break down. For example, it is no longer possible to make sense of the notion of "general position" for cycles. Goresky and MacPherson introduced a class of "allowable" cycles for which general position does make sense. They introduced an equivalence relation for allowable cycles (where only "allowable boundaries" are equivalent to zero), and called the group

of i-dimensional allowable cycles modulo this equivalence relation "intersection homology". They furthermore showed that the intersection of an i- and an -dimensional allowable cycle gives an (ordinary) zero-cycle whose homology class is well-defined.

Stratifications
Intersection homology was originally defined on suitable spaces with a stratification, though the groups often turn out to be independent of the choice of stratification. There are many different definitions of stratified spaces. A convenient one for intersection homology is an n-dimensional topological pseudomanifold. This is a (paracompact, Hausdorff) space X that has a filtration

of X by closed subspaces such that:

Here  is the open cone on L.
.
 is dense in X.

If X is a topological pseudomanifold, the i-dimensional stratum of X is the space .

Examples:
If X is an n-dimensional simplicial complex such that every simplex is contained in an n-simplex and n−1 simplex is contained in exactly two n-simplexes, then the underlying space of X is a topological pseudomanifold.
If X is any complex quasi-projective variety (possibly with singularities) then its underlying space is a topological pseudomanifold, with all strata of even dimension.

Perversities
Intersection homology groups  depend on a choice of perversity , which measures how far cycles are allowed to deviate from transversality. A perversity  is a function

from integers  to the integers such that
.
.

The second condition is used to show invariance of intersection homology groups under change of stratification.

.

Intersection homology groups of complementary dimension and complementary perversity are dually paired.

Examples of perversities 
The minimal perversity has .
Its complement is the upper middle perversity, with values  . If the perversity is not specified, then one usually means the lower middle perversity. If a space can be stratified with all strata of even dimension (for example, any complex variety) then the intersection homology groups are independent of the values of the perversity on odd integers, so the upper and lower middle perversities are equivalent.

Singular intersection homology
Fix a topological pseudomanifold X of dimension n with some stratification, and a perversity p.

A map σ from the standard i-simplex  to X (a singular simplex) is called allowable if

The complex  is a subcomplex of the complex of singular chains on X that consists of all singular chains such that both the chain and its boundary are linear combinations of allowable singular simplexes. The singular intersection homology groups (with perversity p)

are the homology groups of this complex.

If X has a triangulation compatible with the stratification, then simplicial intersection homology groups can be defined in a similar way, and are naturally isomorphic to the singular intersection homology groups.

The intersection homology groups are independent of the choice of stratification of X.

If X is a topological manifold, then the intersection homology groups (for any perversity) are the same as the usual homology groups.

Small resolutions
A resolution of singularities

of a complex variety Y is called a small resolution if for every r > 0, the space of points of Y where the fiber has dimension r is of codimension greater than 2r. Roughly speaking, this means that most fibers are small. In this case the morphism induces an isomorphism from the (intersection) homology of X to the intersection homology of Y (with the middle perversity).

There is a variety with two different small resolutions that have different ring structures on their cohomology, showing that there is in general no natural ring structure on intersection (co)homology.

Sheaf theory
Deligne's formula for intersection cohomology states that

where  is the intersection complex, a certain complex of constructible sheaves on X (considered as an element of the derived category, so the cohomology on the right means the hypercohomology of the complex). The complex  is given by starting with the constant sheaf on the open set  and repeatedly extending it to larger open sets  and then truncating it in the derived category; more precisely it is given by Deligne's formula

Examples 
This is because it is homogeneous of degree , and the derivatives are homogeneous of degree 2. Setting  and  the inclusion map, the intersection complex  is given as
This can be computed explicitly by looking at the stalks of the cohomology. At  where  the derived pushforward is the identity map on a smooth point, hence the only possible cohomology is concentrated in degree . For  the cohomology is more interesting since

for  where the closure of  contains the origin . This can be done by observing  is a  bundle over the elliptic curve , the hyperplane bundle, and the Wang sequence gives the cohomology groupshence the cohomology sheaves at the stalk  are
Truncating this gives the nontrivial cohomology sheaves , hence the intersection complex  has cohomology sheaves

Properties of the complex IC(X)
The complex ICp(X) has the following properties
On the complement of some closed set of codimension 2, we have
 is 0 for i + m ≠ 0, and for i = −m the groups form the constant local system C
 is 0 for i + m < 0
If i > 0 then  is zero except on a set of codimension at least a for the smallest a with p(a) ≥ m − i
If i > 0 then  is zero except on a set of codimension at least a for the smallest a with q(a) ≥ (i)

As usual, q is the complementary perversity to p. Moreover, the complex is uniquely characterized by these conditions, up to isomorphism in the derived category. The conditions do not depend on the choice of stratification, so this shows that intersection cohomology does not depend on the choice of stratification either.

Verdier duality takes ICp to ICq shifted by n = dim(X) in the derived category.

See also
 Decomposition theorem
 Borel–Moore homology
 Topologically stratified space
 Intersection theory
 Perverse sheaf
 Mixed Hodge structure

References

 Armand Borel, Intersection Cohomology. Progress in Mathematics, Birkhauser Boston 
 Mark Goresky and Robert MacPherson, La dualité de Poincaré pour les espaces singuliers. C.R. Acad. Sci. t. 284 (1977), pp. 1549–1551 Serie A .
 
 Goresky, Mark; MacPherson, Robert, Intersection homology theory, Topology 19 (1980), no. 2, 135–162. 
 Goresky, Mark; MacPherson, Robert, Intersection homology. II, Inventiones Mathematicae 72 (1983), no. 1, 77–129. 10.1007/BF01389130  This gives a sheaf-theoretic approach to intersection cohomology.
Frances Kirwan, Jonathan Woolf, An Introduction to Intersection Homology Theory 
 Kleiman, Steven. The development of intersection homology theory. A Century of Mathematics in America, Part II, Hist. Math. 2, Amer. Math. Soc., 1989, pp. 543–585.

External links
 What is the etymology of the term "perverse sheaf"? (includes discussion on the etymology of the term "intersection homology") – MathOverflow

Intersection theory
Algebraic topology
Generalized manifolds
Duality theories
Cohomology theories